I'm with the Band: Nasty Cherry is a 2019 documentary streaming television series. The premise revolves around Charli XCX and her friend and the band's manager, Emmie Lichtenberg, and their progress putting the band Nasty Cherry together.

Cast 

 Gabrielle Bechtel
 Chloe Chaidez
 Debbie Knox-Hewson
 Emmie Lichtenberg
 Georgia Somary
 Dave Stagno
 Charli XCX
 Rex DeTiger
 Sam Pringle
 Parker Silzer IV
 Max Tsiring
 Chayo Bechtel
 Blu DeTiger
 Kitten

Episodes

Release 
I'm with the Band: Nasty Cherry was released on 15 November 2019, on Netflix.

References

External links
 
 

2019 American television series debuts
2010s American reality television series
English-language Netflix original programming
Charli XCX